The 2016 Montevideo Tournament was a summer football friendly tournament organized by La Liga. Matches were played at the Estadio Centenario in Montevideo, Uruguay. Uruguayan clubs Nacional and Peñarol (Primera División) were joined by Spanish clubs Celta Vigo and Deportivo La Coruña (La Liga). It was the inaugural edition of the competition.

Participants

Results
All matches lasted for 90 minutes. If a match was level after normal time then a penalty shoot-out took place to decide who advanced.

Bracket

Matches

Semi-finals

Third place play-off

Final

Goalscorers

Media coverage

Notes

References

2016–17 in Spanish football
2016–17 in Uruguayan football